Greifensee may refer to:

Greifensee (lake), lake in the canton of Zürich in Switzerland
Greifensee, Zürich, municipality located on lake Greifensee